Richard James Barr Goyder AO (born 1960) is an Australian businessman and sporting administrator who is the current chairman of the AFL Commission, the governing body of Australian Rules Football. He was previously CEO and managing director of Wesfarmers from 2005 to 2017. In October 2018, he became the new chairman of Qantas, replacing Leigh Clifford.

Personal life
Goyder was born at Tambellup, Western Australia, and was raised on his parents' farms at Tambellup and Broomehill. He boarded at Hale School, Perth, and then went on to the University of Western Australia, where he graduated with a Bachelor of Commerce degree. Goyder played amateur football for several teams in the WAAFL, but did not progress to higher levels.

Goyder is married with four children. His son Matthew played WAFL football for Claremont. Goyder's main residence is in Mosman Park, WA (a riverside suburb of Perth), though he also owns a holiday home in Augusta and a farm of  near Toodyay.

Business career
After graduating from university, Goyder worked in various positions at Tubemakers of Australia Ltd., an industrial conglomerate. He joined Wesfarmers in 1993, and was initially posted to the company's Business Development Department. He was made managing director of Wesfarmers Dalgety (a subsidiary focusing on rural merchandise) in 1999. Wesfarmers Dalgety merged with IAMA in 2001 to form Wesfarmers Landmark, and Goyder initially stayed on as managing director of the new entity. The following year, he was appointed finance director of the main Wesfarmers company.

Goyder became deputy managing director and chief financial officer of Wesfarmers in 2004, and replaced Michael Chaney as CEO in July 2005. In 2007, he oversaw the purchase of Coles Group for A$19.3 billion, which was "the biggest and one of the riskiest acquisitions in Australian corporate history". This brought Coles Supermarkets, Kmart, Target, and Officeworks under the control of Wesfarmers. In 2014, Goyder was chosen to chair the B20 Summit in Sydney, a meeting of business leaders from the G20 countries. He announced his intention to resign as CEO of Wesfarmers in February 2017, with Rob Scott being appointed as his successor.

Goyder is currently the chairman of the Australian Football League, Woodside Petroleum and Qantas.

Football administration
Goyder served on the board of the Fremantle Football Club from 2006 to 2011, and then in September 2011 was appointed to the AFL Commission. In February 2017, it was announced that he would succeed Mike Fitzpatrick as chairman, with his term beginning on 4 April 2017.

Honours
In 2011, Goyder was awarded an honorary degree, the Doctor of Commerce, by the University of Western Australia. He was made an Officer of the Order of Australia (AO) in the 2013 Australia Day Honours, for "distinguished service to business through executive roles and through the promotion of corporate sponsorship of the arts and Indigenous programs, and to the community".

References

1960 births
Living people
Australian chief executives
Fremantle Football Club administrators
People educated at Hale School
People from Tambellup, Western Australia
Qantas people
University of Western Australia alumni
VFL/AFL administrators
Wesfarmers people
Officers of the Order of Australia
People named in the Paradise Papers